Herbert James Bruton (27 May 1880 – 8 November 1926) was an Australian rules footballer who played with South Melbourne in the Victorian Football League (VFL).

Notes

External links 

1880 births
1926 deaths
Australian rules footballers from Victoria (Australia)
Sydney Swans players